Felix Dahn (9 February 1834 – 3 January 1912) was a German law professor, German nationalist author, poet and historian.

Biography
Ludwig Julius Sophus Felix Dahn was born in Hamburg as the oldest son of Friedrich (1811–1889) and Constanze Dahn who were notable actors at the city's theatre. The family had both German and French roots. Dahn began his studies in law and philosophy in Munich (he had moved there with his parents in 1834), and graduated as Doctor of Laws in Berlin. After his habilitation treatise, Dahn became a lecturer of German Law in Munich in 1857. In 1863 he became senior lecturer/associate professor in Würzburg, received a professorship in Königsberg (in 1872).

Dahn was married to the artist Sophie Fries (1835–1898), with whom he had a son. He tutored baroness Therese von Droste-Hülshoff, a relative of the poet Annette von Droste-Hülshoff, in poetry from 1867 and entered an illicit love affair with her, which he gave a literary treatment in his Sind Götter? (1874). He divorced his wife and married Therese, against opposition from both families, in 1873.

Dahn relocated to University of Breslau in 1888, again as a full professor, and was elected rector of the university in 1895. As rector, he enforced a ban on Polish student associations. 
He was an honorary member of German Student Corps and an active member of the nationalist Alldeutscher Verband.

Dahn received honorary doctorates in Medicine and in Philosophy. 

Dahn died in Breslau, a month before his 78th birthday.

Works
Dahn's writings were influential in the conception of the European Migration Period (Völkerwanderung ) in German historiography of the late 19th and early 20th centuries. His multi-volume Prehistory of the Germanic and Roman Peoples, a chronology of the Migration Period that first appeared in print in 1883, was so definitive that abbreviated versions were reprinted until the late 1970s.

From the 1860s, Dahn regularly wrote for Die Gartenlaube, Germany's most popular family magazine. His nationalist historical novels were widely received, and according to Houdsen (1997) were influential in the formation of the völkisch ideology that formed the "Germany's pre-Hitlerian intellectual background for National Socialism". 
His 1876 Ein Kampf um Rom according to Kipper (2002) contributed to the ethnic essentialism and opposition to ethnic miscegenation of the "völkisch avant-garde".

Dahn published numerous poems, many with a nationalist bent. His Mette von Marienburg portrays bands of "Masures and Poles" hiding in the "Podolian forest".

Besides his historical and literary production, Dahn also published a large amount of specialist legal literature, on topics such as trade law and international law.

Bibliography
1861 – 1911 Die Könige der Germanen (Germanic Kings, 11 parts)
1865 Prokopius von Cäsarea. Ein Beitrag zur Historiographie der Völkerwanderung und des sinkenden Römertums (Procopius of Caesarea)
1875 König Roderich (King Roderick)
1876 Ein Kampf um Rom (A Struggle for Rome)
1877 Die Staatskunst der Frauen (Women's Statecraft)
1880 Odhin's Trost (Odin's Consolation)
1882 - 1901 Kleine Romane aus der Völkerwanderung (Short Novels of the Migrations, 13 parts)
1883 Urgeschichte der germanischen und romanischen Völker (Prehistory of the Germanic and Roman Peoples, four parts)
1884 Die Kreuzfahrer (The Crusaders)
1893 Julian der Abtrünnige (Julian the Apostate)
1902 Herzog Ernst von Schwaben (Duke Ernst of Swabia)

References

Festgabe für Felix Dahn zu seinem fünfzigjährigen Doktorjubiläum. Neudr. d. Ausg. Breslau 1905. Scientia-Verlag, Aalen 1979.  
Kurt Frech: Felix Dahn. Die Verbreitung völkischen Gedankenguts durch den historischen Roman, in: Uwe Puschner, Walter Schmitz, Justus H. Ulbricht (Hrsg.), Handbuch zur „Völkischen Bewegung“ 1871–1918, München, New Providence, London, Paris 1996, S. 685–698. 
Rainer Kipper: Der völkische Mythos. "Ein Kampf um Rom" von Felix Dahn. In: derselbe: Der Germanenmythos im Deutschen Kaiserreich. Formen und Funktionen historischer Selbstthematisierung. Vandenhoeck u. Ruprecht, Göttingen 2002. (= Formen der Erinnerung; 11) 
Stefan Neuhaus: "Das Höchste ist das Volk, das Vaterland!" Felix Dahns "Ein Kampf um Rom" (1876) In: derselbe: Literatur und nationale Einheit in Deutschland. Francke, Tübingen u.a. 2002. S. 230-243. 
Hans Rudolf Wahl: Die Religion des deutschen Nationalismus. Eine mentalitätsgeschichtliche Studie zur Literatur des Kaiserreichs: Felix Dahn, Ernst von Wildenbruch, Walter Flex. Winter, Heidelberg 2002. (= Neue Bremer Beiträge, 12)

External links

 
 
 

Ein Kampf um Rom (PDF; Reprint of 1888 edition at Arno-Schmidt-Referenzbibliothek der GASL)
Ein Kampf um Rom in context of conservative-nationalist literature

1834 births
1912 deaths
Writers from Hamburg
19th-century German historians
German male novelists
German historical novelists
19th-century German novelists
20th-century German novelists
German nationalists
Jurists from Hamburg
Ludwig Maximilian University of Munich alumni
Academic staff of the Ludwig Maximilian University of Munich
Academic staff of the Humboldt University of Berlin
Academic staff of the University of Königsberg
Academic staff of the University of Breslau
Writers of historical fiction set in the Middle Ages
19th-century German male writers
19th-century German writers
20th-century German male writers
German male non-fiction writers